Pniaki  is a village in the administrative district of Gmina Kraśniczyn, within Krasnystaw County, Lublin Voivodeship, in eastern Poland. The village became desolate in first decade of the 21st century.

References

Pniaki